Peter Luther (born 2 January 1939) is a German equestrian and Olympic medalist. He competed in show jumping at the 1984 Summer Olympics in Los Angeles, and won a bronze medal with the German team.

References

1939 births
Living people
German male equestrians
Olympic equestrians of West Germany
Olympic bronze medalists for West Germany
Equestrians at the 1984 Summer Olympics
Olympic medalists in equestrian
Medalists at the 1984 Summer Olympics